Bryan Roberts may refer to:

 Sailor Roberts (Bryan W. Roberts, 1931–1995), American poker player
 Bryan Clieve Roberts (1923–1996), British lawyer, civil servant and colonial administrator